Rivers State, also known as Rivers, is a state in the Niger Delta region of southern Nigeria (Old Eastern Region). Formed in 1967, when it was split from the former Eastern Region, Rivers State borders include: Imo to the north, Abia and Akwa Ibom to the east, and Bayelsa and Delta to the west. The state capital, Port Harcourt, is a metropolis that is considered to be the commercial center of the Nigerian oil industry.

With a population of 5,198,716 as of the 2006 census, Rivers State is the 6th most populous state in  Nigeria. Rivers State is a diverse state that is home to many ethnic groups: Ikwerre Ogoni and Ijaw. The state is particularly noted for its linguistic diversity, with 28 indigenous languages being said to be spoken in Rivers State, these include Ikwerre speaking groups, the Ogoni and Ijaw languages. Rivers State is the 26th largest state by area, and its geography is dominated by the numerous rivers that flow through it, including the Bonny River.

The economy of Rivers State is dominated by the state's booming petroleum industry. Although the rise of the oil industry has led to increased revenue for the state government, mismanagement and corruption have prevented the state from rapid development and meaningfully tackling poverty. During the 2000s, Rivers State saw a rise in the number of cult killings committed within the state. In 2019, Governor Ezenwo Nyesom Wike declared Rivers State to be a Christian state because it is made up of 90% Christians and 10% orthodox with few practicing Islam unconventionally.

History

Territory and status 
Rivers State, named after the many rivers that border its territory, was part of the Oil Rivers Protectorate from 1885 till 1893 when it became part of the Niger Coast Protectorate. In 1900, the region was merged with the chartered territories of the Royal Niger Company to form the colony of Southern Nigeria. The state was formed in 1967 with the split of the Eastern Region of Nigeria. In 1996 the state lost territory to form Bayelsa State.

20th century
In the early days of the colonial period, several protection treaties were signed between various indigenous communities and the British colonial government. Between 1941 and 1952, agitation for the creation of Rivers province began with the formation of the Ijo Rivers People's League. By 1953, the Council of Rivers Chiefs was birthed as a replacement body for the League, the same year, another organization, the Calabar Ogoja Rivers (COR) State Movement became existent.

The Council of Rivers Chiefs was later renamed in 1954 to Rivers Chiefs and People's Congress and in 1956, the organization became known as the Rivers Chiefs People's Conference. Until 1958, hopes of an independent state resonated with the region and lingered consistently in the minds of its natives. During the constitutional conference that year, the country's nationhood was affirmed while an agreement was reached on some measures to mitigate the fears of the ethnic minorities in the area. Around this time, the COR State Movement had broken away to press their own case. Thereafter, the British launched a commission led by Sir Henry Willink to look into the misgivings of these autochthons. The Willink Commission initiated the conception of the Niger Delta Development Board (NDDB). The purpose was to tackle the problems of underdevelopment, however, this failed to rise to the expectations of the masses. After much discontent, some of the people attempted to take the extralegal route to achieve their goals.

In February 1966, Isaac Boro, Sam Owonaro and Nottingham Dick alongside their supporters proclaimed a "Delta People's Republic". The rebellion persisted for twelve days but was resisted by the Federal and the old Eastern Nigeria government. On 27 May 1967, under the administration of General Yakubu Gowon, Decree No. 14 was issued, allowing the creation of Rivers State. From then on, complaints about political marginalisation, environmental degradation and economic pauperisation remained among the Ijaw groups, such that a separate Bayelsa State was carved out of Rivers State by the military government of Sani Abacha on 1 October 1996 and Omuma Local Government Area of Rivers State was created on same day to include communities such as Umuru in Ofeh.

Geography 
Rivers State is a predominantly low-lying pluvial state in southern Nigeria, located in the eastern part of the Niger Delta on the oceanward extension of the Benue Trough. The inland part of the state consists of tropical rainforest, and towards the coast, the typical Niger Delta environment features many mangrove swamps. Surrounding states are Imo, Abia and Anambra to the north, Akwa Ibom to the east and Bayelsa, Delta to the west. On the south, it is bounded by the Atlantic Ocean. Its topography ranges from flat plains, with a network of rivers to tributaries.

Climate 

Rainfall is generally seasonal, variable, as well as heavy, and occurs between the months of March and October through November. The wet season peaks in July, lasting more than 290 days. The only dry months are January and February having little to no effect.

For Port Harcourt, temperatures throughout the year are relatively constant with little variation throughout the course of the seasons. Relative humidity rarely dips below 60% and fluctuates between 90% and 100% for most of the year.

Terrain 
The land surface of Rivers State can be divided into three zones: freshwater swamps, mangrove swamps and coastal sand ridges. The freshwater zone extends northwards from the mangrove swamps. This land surface is generally less than 20m above sea level. As a lower Niger floodplain, it contains a greater silt and clay foundation and is more susceptible to perennial inundation by river floods. The floodplain's total thickness rises to about 45m in the northeast and over 9m in the beach ridge barrier zones to the southwest.

On coastal sand ridges, the soils are mostly sandy or sandy loams. Various crops are supported including coconut, oil palm, raffia palm and cocoyam. The drier upland region of Rivers State covers 61% of landmass while the riverine areas, with a relief range of 2m to 5m, take up 39%.

Flora and fauna 

Due to its geographical location, Rivers State has always played an important role in the natural history of Nigeria, having been found to host a vast array of wildlife and plants. Its tropical rainforests are home to more species than all other local biomes combined thanks to its climate and canopy structure. Unfortunately, some of the upland forested areas have seen disruption from human activity, impacting negatively on the biodiversity and ecological  functions of natural habitats. In most places, the dominant vegetation usually consists of Elaeis guineensis which has the highest productivity amongst all recognized oleaginous crops.

The riverine part of the state has three hydro-vegetation zones such as beach ridge, salt water and fresh water. Each zone has its own characteristics and composition, with the freshwaters encompassing the upper and lower floodplains of the Niger Delta.

The park's vegetation has progressively developed into a high forest considering the form from which it began in 1999. There are two storeys that can be distinguished from outside the forest, the emergents include Symphonia globulifera, Cleistopholis patens, Uapaca spp., Musanga cecropioides, Hallea ledermannii, Terminalia spp., Anthostema aubryanum, Tectona grandis and Elaeis guineensis. The understory is composed mainly of Calamus deeratus, Alchornea cordifolia, Monodora tenuifolia, Harungana madagascariensis, Strophanthus preussii, Rauvolfia vomitoria and Raphia spp.

The interior of the forest is very shady, and as a result a wide variety of shade tolerant forbs (e.g. Nephrolepis biserrata, Culcasia scandens, Laportea spp., Chromolaena odorata, Aframomum melegueta and Costus afer) and various sedges form thickets on the forest floor. By dry season, large cushion of litter cover the floor because of increase in abscission rate of some plants such as Musanga cecropioides, Hallea ledermannii, Calamus deeratus, Gmelina arborea, Raphia spp. and Elaeis guineensis.

Mammals, reptiles and amphibians are also found in the park. The common mammals are mona monkeys and pygmy hippopotamuses. Among the reptiles and amphibians are snakes and crocodiles, turtles, frogs, lizards, and skinks.

One of the world's Ramsar Convention-listed wetlands, Upper Orashi Forest, is a  protected area in Ahoada West. It has been identified by BirdLife International as an IBA because of its importance to global populations of grey parrots and other birds. The Biseni Forest in the north west of Ahoada and west of Upper Orashi Forest have also been designated an Important Bird Area. The forest has an area of  within which mammals like red-bellied monkey and yellow-backed duiker are found along with raffia palms and some woody broadleaved species such as Symphonia globulifera and Ficus spp.

Rivers 

The state has many rivers, some of which include: 
Andoni River
Bonny River
New Calabar River
Nun River
Orashi River
 
Bodo River
Eleme/Okrika River
Emesu River
Imo-Ogoni River
Kaa River
Ngololo River
Ogu/Onne River
Ogochie River
Okulu Aleto River Channel
Oloshi River
Opobo Channel River
Otamiriochie River
San Bartholomeo River
Santa Barbara River
Sombreiro River
Sii Nama River
St Nicholas River

Population

Demographics 

Over the period from 1991 to 2006, the total population of Rivers State increased by close to 3 million people. The last official census showed that 5,198,716 people were living in the state, of whom 2,673,026 were male and 2,525,690 were female. Adults and adolescents aged 15 to 64 years accounted for 61% of the population in the state. Children below the age of 15 accounted for 36% of the population, and those aged 65 years and above, another 3%. Port Harcourt and Obio-Akpor had the highest number of inhabitants of any local government area, while Ogu–Bolo and Omuma had the lowest.

Rivers State has higher literacy rate compared to most states in the South South geopolitical zone. Its male literacy as of 2006 was 52.3% while female literacy rate was 47.7%. In the same survey, it ranked as 26th most extensive and the 6th most populous of all the states of Nigeria. A 2015 estimate put the number of residents of Rivers State at over 7 million, nearly triple the number recorded in 1991.

According to the National Bureau of Statistics projection, the population in the state was 4% of the total population of the country. Data of 2010–2015 showed life expectancies for male, 54 years and female, 57 years were very low. General mortality rate was 60 per 1000, under-5 mortality rate was 90 and maternal mortality rate was 889 per 100,000 live births, one of the highest nationwide.

Ethnic Groups in Rivers State 
Rivers State is made up of numerous ethnic groups which includes: Abua, Andoni, Ekpeye (Igbo), Bille, Eleme, Egbema (Igbo community found also in Imo State), Kalabari, Ndoki (Igbo community found also in Abia State), Ndoni, Okrika, Ogoni, Engenni, Etche (Igboid), Ibani, Ikwerre (Igboid), Ogba, Odua etc.

Rivers state has a rich cultural-heritage, they are  friendly and known for their hospitality. It is on record that Port Harcourt is the second biggest commercial, agriculture and busiest Airport & seaports in Nigeria. Rivers state has two seaports situated in Port Harcourt and Onne.

Languages 
As a multi-cultural, multi-tribal region, Rivers State has much to offer in its diversity of people. The area that makes up the modern state has been inhabited in one way or the other since the last year of the first millennium. The earliest known settled communities in what is now Rivers State include the Riverine Ijaw; Ogoni; [Andoni] on the lower Imo River and coastal shores of the main-lands and  Ikwerre people and other Igboid groups on the main-lands. Today, over 26 distinct groups are recognized by the Rivers State government, each with its own language, lifestyle, and cultural heritage.

Multilingualism is a part of everyday life for the population of Rivers State and most of Nigeria. English, inherited from colonial rule is common and widely spoken in various forms in different localities. Some indigenous Riverians are also bilingual, speaking a mixture of English or Pidgin English with one of the native languages. This is partly due to the frequent exposure of the younger generations to foreign dialects especially in the country's largest cities. Excluding Pidgin, all other ones spoken in the state belong to either Benue–Congo or Ijoid and Ogoni Languages within the Niger–Congo language family. The Benue–Congo is subdivided into Cross River, Igboid, and Edoid groups. The Ijoid languages are predominant around the creek belt, Ogoni languages - about 5 of them spoken across the southern parts of the state, Igboid group of language is spoken in Northern Areas of Rivers State.

Languages of Rivers State listed by LGA:

Economy 

Rivers State has maintained its importance as a leading supplier of wealth to the nation for centuries. In 2007, the state ranked 2nd nationwide with a gross domestic product (GDP) of $21.07 billion and a per capita income of $3,965.

Natural resources
The state is famous for its vast reserves of crude oil and natural gas. It was perhaps the richest and most important section of the African zone of the British Empire. Rivers State has two major oil refineries, two major seaports, airports,  and various industrial estates spread across the land. More than 60% of the country's output of crude oil is produced in the state. Other natural resources found within its boundaries are silica sand, glass sand and clay.

Agriculture
Prior to the discovery of oil in commercial quantity in 1951, Agriculture was the primary occupation of the people of Rivers State. Around the 19th century when the industrial revolution reached its peak in England, the area was then referred to as Oil Rivers Protectorate, this was due to its abundant palm oil and kernel which basically constituted the main revenue source of the country. In a sample survey carried out by the Federal Ministry of Agriculture and Natural Resources, about 40% of the rural inhabitants were committed to farming in 1983. Rivers State is one of the leading states in the production of yam, cassava, cocoyam, maize, rice and beans. About 39% (760,000 hectares) of the state's total land mass, particularly in the upland area, is suitable for cultivation. Major cash crops produced are oil palm products, rubber, coconut, raffia palm and jute. Other crops grown for food include vegetables,  melon, pineapples, mango, pepper, banana and plantain. The fishing industry is an important sector in Rivers State.  Besides being lucrative, fishing is also a favourite past time activity. There are approximately 270 species of fish existing;  with many artisanal fishermen in the riverine areas. The state provides valuable seafood such as crabs, oysters,  shrimps and sea snails among others. Vertebrates like birds, mammals and reptiles are also found in the region.

Infrastructure

Energy

Energy, and especially electricity is the key factor for economic growth. Rivers State has one of the nation's highest per capita energy consumption rates. As of 2012, it had a power generation capacity of 400 megawatts, a significant improvement over a meagre 30 megawatts during the late nineties. Its energy sector is protected by the government through legislation and funding. It is overseen by the ministries of Power, Energy and Natural Resources. The state's oil-refining capacity is the biggest in the country, with more than 340,000 barrels of crude oil per day.

There's a vast untapped potential in the state for solar power. Interest in solar energy has been increasing but not much has been invested. Up to now, energy production is insufficient to meet demand, resulting in frequent power outages, slow manufacturing and business performance.

Transportation

Transportation within Rivers State is mainly land and water-based. The industry has the Ministry of Transport as its chief regulating body. Apart from roads and waterways, there are functional airdromes that provide out-of-state transport. The sea ports contain harbors where ships can dock and transfer people or cargo to or from land.

Taxicabs, buses and ferries dominate public transport. They are usually inexpensive and are often used for multi passenger pick ups. Commercial vehicles in Port Harcourt maintain sky blue, white and sky blue livery. Operating without these government-approved colors is punishable with a fine of ₦10,000.

Both domestic and international flights are available from Port Harcourt International Airport. Airlines such as Lufthansa, Air France, Qatar Air, Ethiopian Airlines, Med-View, Air Peace and Cronos link the state to destinations including Frankfurt, Paris, Lagos and Malabo. Passengers can easily get a taxi or rental car at the authorized vehicle area. Companies like Europcar, Avis and Hertz have offices near the airport. In addition, the Port Harcourt Air Force Base is located in the state capital. It gained popularity as a commercial destination due to the closure of the international airport. After that airport reopened, most airlines abandoned the base. However, it still has some destinations since the airport is closer to the centre than the main airport.

Seaports handle much more diversified import cargo activities than airports. The Port of Onne is one of the largest and busiest seaports in the country. Its mobile harbour cranes are one of the biggest in Africa, with a lifting capacity of 208 metric tonnes. Another important seaport is the Port of Port Harcourt. It was the second largest port in Nigeria in the 1950s. In 1954, it cleared about $54 million worth of imports and exports, while the shipping facilities at Calabar cleared $11 million worth of goods.

Water
The majority of Riverians obtain their water for household uses from vendors. There are also those who extract their water from private boreholes and wells and incur costs for the investment, maintenance, spare parts, pumping, and in some cases treating the water. Several others receive their domestic water from rainwater catchments, nearby streams or rivers. In the oil-bearing communities, many residents have easy access to basic infrastructure systems, although, most of the facilities are nonfunctional.

In the large urban localities such as Port Harcourt and Obio-Akpor, Port Harcourt Water Corporation handles the provision of urban water supply and wastewater management services for 15% of the population. A number of towns and villages with iron-contaminated H2O have resorted to treating one chemical contaminant with another. Most of the water collection in low-income urban residential areas is done by women. In 2008, NDHS reported that 26% of adult females collect drinking water more than adult male counterparts at 21%.

In order to improve access to safe, reliable, affordable, and sustainable water supply services, USAID, through its Sustainable Water and Sanitation in Africa program collaborated with the Ministry of Water Resources and Rural Development from April 2013 to June 2015.

Government and politics 

The Rivers State government consists of elected representatives and appointed officials. The state government has executive and legislative branches, with an independent judiciary. At the local level, elected officials are responsible for local government areas.

Executive
The executive branch is headed by the Governor, assisted by the Deputy Governor, both elected for a term of 4 years (maximum of 2 terms). The governor appoints commissioners responsible for each of the ministries and appoints the heads of parastatals, and the state-owned bodies with specific regulatory or administrative duties. In some cases, a governor may be replaced or removed for example, through death, impeachment or if an election is annulled by a competent court of law or by a two-thirds majority of the House of Assembly.
The incumbent governor is Ezenwo Nyesom Wike a member of People Democratic Party, who heads the council of Rivers State. Wike was sworn in on 29 May 2015. He is the 6th Democratic governor of the state and the 15th overall governor of River State

Legislature
The legislative authority in Rivers State is held by the state House of Assembly, which is made up of elected representatives from all constituencies of the state. Its functions at the state level are relative to those of the National Assembly at the federal level, creating laws for the good governance of the state, as well as acting as a check and balance on the powers and actions of the state's Chief Executive. The House of Assembly consists three times the total number of seats which the state has in the House of Representatives.

Judiciary

The judicial branch of the state government has sole authority and responsibility for the interpretation and application of the state's laws as well as the adjudication of disputes or controversies. It consists of eight courts: the High Court of Justice, the Magistrates Courts, the Customary Courts, the Juveniles Courts,  the Revenue Courts, the Sanitation Courts, the Mobile Courts and Ports Related Offences Courts. It is governed mainly by the Chief Judge of the High Court of Justice. There are about 26 serving judges in the High Court of Justice, which comprises 10 Judicial Divisions including Port Harcourt, Ahoada, Degema, Nchia, Bori, Omoku, Isiokpo, Okrika,  Okehi, and Oyigbo.

Federal representation
Elections are conducted every 4 years in which Riverian voters will directly elect 16 representatives to the Nigerian National Assembly. Those chosen are grouped into 3 senators representing Rivers South East, Rivers West, Rivers East and 13 representatives representing Andoni/Opobo/Nkoro, Obio/Akpor, Oyigbo/Tai/Eleme, Port Harcourt II, Etche/Omuma, Asari-Toru/Akuku-Toru, Okrika/Ogu–Bolo, Khana/Gokana, Port Harcourt I, Ahoada West/Ogba–Egbema–Ndoni, Abua–Odual/Ahoada East, Ikwerre/Emohua, Degema/Bonny. Since the advent of the Fourth Republic in 1999, the People's Democratic Party has usually held a majority in both the Senate and the House of Representatives.

Local Government Areas
Rivers State currently consists of 23 Local Government Areas (LGAs), all of which handle local administration, under an elected Chairman. Each of the local government areas has its own administrative seat. They are:

Cities and towns

Education

Primary and secondary education

As at 1999, the state had 2,805 government primary schools and 243 secondary schools. The secondary schools are concentrated mainly in LGA headquarter towns and in Port Harcourt.

Colleges and universities
Tertiary institutions include:
 Captain Elechi Amadi Polytechnic formerly Port Harcourt Polytechnic
 Eastern Polytechnic
 Federal College of Education (Technical), Omoku.
 Ignatius Ajuru University at Rumuolumeni, Nkpolu Oroworukwo and Ndele. 
 Kenule Beeson Saro-Wiwa Polytechnic
 PAMO University of Medical Sciences,Elelenwo, Port Harcourt
 Rivers State University.
 University of Port Harcourt, Choba.
 
 Ken Saro Wiwa Polytechnic at Bori.
 School of Health Technology, Port Harcourt
 School of Nursing and Midwifery, Rumueme, Port Harcourt.

Notable people

See also 
 Index of Rivers State-related articles
 Outline of Rivers State
 List of Governors of Rivers State by time in office
 List of people from Rivers State

Electoral System
The governor of the state is selected using a modified two-round system. To be elected in the first round, a candidate must receive the plurality of votes and over 25% of the vote in at least two-third of the state local government areas. If no candidate passes threshold, a second round will be held between the top candidate and the next candidate to have received a plurality of votes in the highest number of local government areas

References

Further reading

External links 

 Rivers State government website

 
States of Nigeria
States and territories established in 1967
Coasts of Nigeria
Rainforests of Africa
1967 establishments in Nigeria